The  2020 Big 12 Championship Game was a college football game played on Saturday, December 19, 2020, at AT&T Stadium in Arlington. This was the 19th Big 12 Championship Game and determined the 2020 champion of the Big 12 Conference. The game featured the top-seeded, Iowa State Cyclones and the second-seeded, Oklahoma Sooners. Sponsored by soft drink brand Dr Pepper, the game is officially known as the Dr Pepper Big 12 Championship Game.

The game was originally scheduled for December 5 but rescheduled to December 12 when the new schedule was released, and was eventually pushed even further back to December 19 due to the COVID-19 pandemic.

Previous season
The 2019 Big 12 Championship Game featured Oklahoma against Baylor. It was Baylor's first appearance in the conference title game. Oklahoma had won the regular-season game in Waco 34–31. In the championship game, Oklahoma was victorious by a score of 30–23 in overtime, winning their fifth consecutive and 14th overall Big 12 Conference championship.

Teams
The 2020 Championship game was contested by Iowa State and Oklahoma. The teams met 85 times previously, with Oklahoma leading the series 76–7–2. Iowa State defeated Oklahoma 37–30 in their regular season match-up in Ames.

Iowa State

Iowa State, led by head coach Matt Campbell, clinched a berth in the championship game after defeating West Virginia on December 5, 2020. This marked their first appearance in a Big 12 Championship Game. Iowa State finished the regular season with eight conference wins and the best record in the Big 12 - both firsts for the program. Entering this game, Iowa State head coach Matt Campbell was the only Cyclone head coach with multiple wins over the Sooners. The Cyclones’ #6 CFP ranking was the highest the program had ever achieved.

Oklahoma

Oklahoma, led by head coach Lincoln Riley, was the defending Big 12 champion. They clinched a berth in the championship game after defeating Baylor on December 5, 2020. This marked their 12th overall Big 12 championship game appearance, and fifth consecutive win in the Championship Game.

Game summary

Statistics

Summary
Unlike their matchup earlier in the year, a shootout between two highly efficient offenses, the Oklahoma Sooners instead jumped out to an early 17 point lead which they never relinquished. Trailing 24-7 to begin the 2nd half, both the Cyclone offense and defense sprung to life, scoring 14 unanswered to bring the score within 3 points. A Gabe Brkic field goal with 2 minutes left extended the Sooner lead to 6, leaving the door open for the Cyclones to win the game with a touchdown drive. Driving into Oklahoma territory, Brock Purdy threw his 3rd interception of the day with under a minute to go, sealing the Sooners sixth consecutive Big 12 Championship.

See also
 List of Big 12 Conference football champions

References

External links
 Game statistics at statbroadcast.com

Big 12 Championship Game
Big 12 Championship Game
Iowa State Cyclones football games
Oklahoma Sooners football games
Big 12 Championship Game
American football in the Dallas–Fort Worth metroplex
Big 12 Championship Game
Big 12 Championship Game